Usha Nadkarni (born 13 September 1946) is an Indian actress who predominantly works in Hindi and Marathi films and television who is best known for her role of Savita Deshmukh in the popular show Pavitra Rishta, for which she was nominated in Zee Rishtey Awards as "Best Evil Mother-in-Law". She participated as a contestant on the Marathi version of Bigg Boss in 2018 and became one of the oldest contestant to participate in Bigg Boss. She is best known for her evil roles in Marathi and Hindi films. In 2015, she starred in a stage show, Londoncharya Aajibai by Rajiv Joshi, playing the community leader Aajibai Banarase.

Filmography

Television

Awards

See also 

 List of Indian film actresses

References

External links 

 

Living people
20th-century Indian actresses
Indian television actresses
1946 births
Actresses in Marathi cinema
Actresses from Mumbai
Actresses in Hindi cinema
21st-century Indian actresses
Indian film actresses
Actresses in Hindi television
Actresses in Marathi television
Bigg Boss Marathi contestants